Wang Guohua (born 30 January 1975) is a Chinese weightlifter. He competed in the men's featherweight event at the 1996 Summer Olympics.

References

1975 births
Living people
Chinese male weightlifters
Olympic weightlifters of China
Weightlifters at the 1996 Summer Olympics
Place of birth missing (living people)
20th-century Chinese people